Lavenay is a former commune in the Sarthe department in the region of Pays de la Loire in north-western France. On 1 January 2017, it was merged into the new commune Loir en Vallée. Its population was 341 in 2019.

Geography
The Braye forms most of the commune's south-eastern border, then flows into the Loir, which forms most of its south-western border.

Transport
The railway station is at Pont-de-Braye, a hamlet south of Lavenay.

See also
Communes of the Sarthe department

References

Former communes of Sarthe